Edoardo Padovani (born 15 May 1993) is an Italian professional rugby union player who primarily plays fullback for Benetton of the United Rugby Championship. He has also represented Italy at international level, having made his test debut against England during the 2016 Six Nations Championship. Padovani has previously played for clubs such as Mogliano, Zebre Parma, and Toulon in the past.

Club career 
Padovani played for Mogliano in the 2012-2013 and 2013-2014 season, playing 32 games, scoring 69 points.

Padovani joined Zebre in 2014/15, playing 13 games, scoring 11 points, playing 616 minutes in Pro 12. Playing 3 games, scoring 25 points in the EPCR. In the 2015/2016 season, he played 9 games, starting 3, scoring 15 points in Pro12, and playing 234 minutes. In the EPCR he played 6 games, starting 4 and scoring 32 points. In 2016/2017 he played 15 games, starting 9 and scoring 10 points in the Pro12 and playing 4 games, scoring 6 points in the EPCR.  He did not renew a contract with Zebre Rugby and at the end of the season 2016-2017, he signed with Toulon.

Padovani joined Toulon for 2017 - 2018 season from Italian team Zebre.
 On 15 December 2017 Toulon released Padovani from the contract.

In December 2017, Padovani signed again with Zebre.

On 22 April 2020, Padovani left Zebre for local Italian rivals Benetton in the Pro14 ahead of the 2020-21 season.

International career 
In 2012 and 2013 Padovani played for Italy U20 and in 2014 for Emerging Italy.
In 2016, he was selected for the Italian 6 Nations squad and made his debut against England in Round 2 of that Tournament.
On 18 August 2019, he was named in the final 31-man squad for the 2019 Rugby World Cup.

On 19 March 2022, Padovani scored a try in the last minute of Italy Vs Wales to secure Italy's first Six Nations win in seven years.

International tries
As of 19 November 2022

References

External links 

1993 births
Living people
Italian rugby union players
Italy international rugby union players
Zebre Parma players
RC Toulonnais players
Italian expatriate rugby union players
Expatriate rugby union players in France
Italian expatriate sportspeople in France
Sportspeople from Venice
Rugby union centres
Rugby union fullbacks
Rugby union wings
Mogliano Rugby players
Benetton Rugby players